Ramkrishna Nagar College, established in 1964, is a general degree college situated at Ramkrishna Nagar, in Karimganj, Assam, India. It is affiliated with Assam University.

Departments

Science
Physics
Mathematics
Chemistry

Arts
Bengali
English
Sanskrit
Hindi
History
Education
Economics
Philosophy
Political science
Sociology

References

External links
http://www.rknagarcollege.org/

Universities and colleges in Assam
Colleges affiliated to Assam University
Educational institutions established in 1964
1964 establishments in Assam